Victor Arménise was an Italian cinematographer. Arménise worked on over eighty feature films during his lifetime. He began his career working on Italian silent films. He later made films in several other countries including Britain and Germany but primarily in France. He worked with a number of leading directors including Raoul Walsh and Maurice Tourneur.

Selected filmography
 Messalina (1924)
 Pawns of Passion (1928)
 The Story of a Little Parisian (1928)
 Ship in Distress (1929)
 Everybody Wins (1930)
 When Love Is Over (1931)
 Dance Hall (1931)
 His Best Client (1932)
 Orange Blossom (1932)
 Temptation (1934)
 Sapho (1934)
 Antonia (1935)
 Variety (1935)
 Koenigsmark (1935)
 Accused (1936)
 Samson (1936)
 Crime Over London (1936)
 The Club of Aristocrats (1937)
 The Kings of Sport (1937)
 Jump for Glory (1937)
 Mother Love (1938)
 Monsieur Coccinelle (1938)
 Behind the Facade (1939)
 Nine Bachelors (1939)
 Extenuating Circumstances (1939)
 They Were Twelve Women (1940)
 The Acrobat (1941)
 Prince Charming (1942)
 Bolero (1942)
 Arlette and Love (1943)
 St. Val's Mystery (1945)
 Father Goriot (1945)
 The Captain (1946)
 The Three Cousins (1947)
 Blonde (1950)
 Double or Quits (1953)
 The Porter from Maxim's (1953)

Bibliography
 Moss, Marilyn Ann. Raoul Walsh: The True Adventures of Hollywood's Legendary Director. University Press of Kentucky, 2011.

External links

1896 births
Year of death unknown
Italian cinematographers
People from Bari